Vive Latino - Festival Iberoamericano de Cultura Musical is an annual music festival held in Mexico City. It is one of the most important music festivals in Mexico, featuring a great variety of groups of many genres.

The event takes place in Foro Sol usually in the months of March and April. The duration of the festival has been one to three days, depending on the number of live acts, but since 2010 the festival's length has been 2 or 3 days. The first edition was in 1998, and has been repeated yearly ever since (except for 1999 and 2002). The number of stages has changed over the time, ranging from 2 to 4.

The festival's concept is to every year gather important and newcoming bands from all over Ibero-America for three days to create a  space for alternative music and new proposals from different Spanish-speaking bands. In the history of the festival there's been a series of important musical performances by many artists from Latin America and Spain, such as Café Tacuba, Enrique Bunbury, Charly García, Aterciopelados, Los Tres, Caifanes, Bersuit Vergarabat, El Cuarteto de Nos, Illya Kuryaki and the Valderramas, Los Planetas, Gustavo Cerati, Los Amigos Invisibles, Babasónicos, Miguel Ríos, Celso Piña, Los Jaigüey, El Tri, Ratones Paranoicos, Nortec Collective, Sepultura, Divididos, Transmetal, Ángeles del Infierno, 2 Minutos, Control Machete, Los Bunkers, etc.

Besides Ibero-American musical acts, the festival has been opened for proposals from all over the world, with special appearances by Latin bands located in the U.S. such as Los Lobos, Tito & Tarantula, Devendra Banhart, Ill Niño, Brujeria, The Mars Volta, Los Straitjackets, Rodrigo y Gabriela, Ozomatli, and Los Abandoned. The festival bill has also had non-Spanish speaking acts like The Magic Numbers, Black Rebel Motorcycle Club, The Chemical Brothers, Urlaub in Polen, Blasted Mechanism, Calexico, Jane's Addiction, The National, DeVotchKa, Deftones, Marky Ramone, and Red Hot Chili Peppers among others.

Every year the festival's line up has a strong presence in the ska and reggae acts, having big figures of the genre such as The Wailers, The Skatalites, Desmond Dekker, Fishbone, Tokyo Ska Paradise Orchestra, Steel Pulse, Reel Big Fish, and Save Ferris, besides the performances from important Ibero-American bands like Panteón Rococó, Los Fabulosos Cadillacs, Ska-P, Los Auténticos Decadentes, Desorden Público, and Maldita Vecindad.

As the festival itself is not limited to rock acts, it has often acts of entirely unrelated music genres. This, however, proved to be disastrous in the 2007 edition, which included a Reggaetón act by Calle 13, that angered a big section of the public, which booed and even threw bottles and objects at the stage forcing the band to leave.

November 1998

Aterciopelados, Café Tacuba, Molotov, Maldita Vecindad, Illya Kuryaki, Control Machete, Todos Tus Muertos, Ángeles del Infierno, Tijuana No, El Gran Silencio, La Cuca, Las Víctimas del Doctor Cerebro, Resorte, Sekta Core, Los Esquizitos, Titán, Los de Abajo, Guillotina, Salón Victoria, Riesgo de contagio, Flor De Lingo, Quehaceres de Mamá, Ozomatli, El Tri, Miguel Ríos, Juan Perro, Danza Invisible, La Lupita, Cecilia Toussaint, Aterciopelados, Los Tres, Santa Sabina, La Barranca, Julieta Venegas, La Castañeda, Ritmo Peligroso, Kenny y los Eléctricos, La Gusana Ciega, Julio revueltas, Ely Guerra, La Dosis, Poncho Kingz, La Ley.

November 2000
Saturday, 11 November - Sunday, 12 November

Habana, Tito & Tarantula, Ely Guerra, Zurdok, Panteón Rococó, Los Auténticos Decadentes, Mariachi Terror, La Castañeda, Ganadores De La Resistencia, Los Amigos Invisibles, Dover, Fishbone, The Wailers, Ska-P, Molotov, Los Fabulosos Cadillacs, Los Tetas, Sekta Core, Desorden Público, Divididos, Resorte, La Gusana Ciega, Julieta Venegas, Jumbo, Los Pericos, El Gran Silencio, Enrique Bunbury, Jaguares

November 2001
Saturday, 24 November

Bersuit Vergarabat, Desorden Público, El Gran Silencio, Genitallica, Havana, José Fors, Joselo, La Lupita, La Verbena Popular, Liquits, Los de Abajo, Los Estrambóticos, Lucybell, Maldita Vecindad, Moderatto, Panteón Rococó, Pericos, Puya, Resorte, Revólver, Save Ferris, Zurdok

May 2003
Sunday, 11 May

Aterciopelados, Babasónicos, Café Tacuba, Cartel de Santa, El Gran Silencio, Enanitos Verdes, Los Estrambóticos, Genitallica, Guillotina, Jumbo, Kinky, Los de Abajo, Los Tetas, Molotov, Natalia Lafourcade, Panteón Rococó, Pito Perez, Resorte, Televisión Kamikaze, Las Ultrasónicas, Vicentico

May 2004 
Sunday, 9 May

Ángeles del Infierno, Antidoping, Azul Violeta, Babasónicos, Bersuit, Cartel de Santa, Catupecu Machu, Crista Galli, Chancho en Piedra, Circo, Control Machete, Cuca, Dildo, Ely Guerra, Fobia, Haragán y Cia, Ill Niño, Julieta Venegas, Kinky, La Barranca, Liquits, Los Amantes de Lola, Los Auténticos Decadentes, Lost Acapulco, Lucybell, Maldita Vecindad, Moderatto, Rata Blanca, Santa Sabina, Televisión Kamikaze, The Mars Volta, Vaquero, Volumen Cero, Zoé

April 2005
Sunday, 16 April

Austin TV, Babasónicos, Big Metra, Botellita de Jeréz, Cartel de Santa, Catupecu Machu, De saloon, Desmond Decker, División Minúscula, Ely Guerra, Estrambóticos, Grandmama, Jarabe de Palo, La Casta, La Lupita, Liquits, Lira n' Roll, Los Abandoned, Los de abajo, Los Látigos, Los Shajatos, LVzbel, macaco, Mario, Moderatto, Molotov, Panteón Rococó, Pericos, Porter, Quiero Club, San Pascualito Rey, Skatalites, Sussie 4, Telefunka, Thermo, Tólidos, Vicentico, Zoé, Zuker XP.

May 2006
Saturday, 13 May - Sunday, 14 May

Allison, Amaral, Austin TV, Bengala, Brujeria, Charly Montana, Disidente, División Minúscula, El Gran Silencio, Elis Paprika, Fobia, Kinky, Líbido, Los Abandoned, Los de abajo, Los Dynamite, Los planetas, Lost Acapulco, Lucybell, Nortec Collective, Panteón Rococó, Pato Machete, Plastiko, Rastrillos, Resorte, San Pascualito Rey, Thermo, Vaquero, Yucatán A Go Go, Zurdok, Agora, Bersuit, Big Metra, Celtas cortos, Chetes, Desorden Público, Dildo, Instituto Mexicano del Sonido, Joselo, Jumbo, Julieta Venegas, La Gusana Ciega, Los Auténticos Decadentes, Los Búnkers, Los Esquizitos, Los Super Elegantes (Milena Muzquiz and Martiniano Lopez), Los Tres, Maria Daniela y su Sonido Lasser, Niña, Ozomatli, Palomazo informativo, Panda, Plastilina Mosh, Porter, San Pascualito Rey, Satin Dolls, Tex Tex, Titán, Tolidos, Turf, Víctimas del Dr. Cerebro, Zoé.

May 2007
Saturday, 5 May - Sunday, 6 May

Austin TV, Becker, Bengala, Café Tacvba, COhETICA, Calle 13, Canseco, Gustavo Cerati, Chetes, Chikita Violenta, Nortec Collective, Mariachi Terror, Columpio Asesino, Cuarteto de nos, Cuca, Desorden Público, Devendra Banhart, División Minúscula, El Tri, Ely Guerra, Fenómeno fuzz, Finde, Flavio Cianciarulo, Fobia, Furland, Gondwana, Hana, Instituto Mexicano del Sonido, Jessy Bulbo, Jumbo, Kill Aniston, Kinky, La gusana ciega, La Tremenda Korte, Liquits, Los Amigos Invisibles, Los Bunkers, Los Dynamite, Los Gatos, Los Licuadora, Los Músicos de José, Los Piojos, No somos machos pero somos muchos, Ozomatli, Pastilla, Porter, Quiero Club, Rata Blanca, Réplica, San Pascualito Rey, Sargent García, Satin Dolls, Six Million Dollar Weirdo, Sonidero Nacional, Sr. Bikini, Steel Pulse, Tanke, The Cosmetics, The Locos, The Magic Numbers, Transmetal, Veo Muertos, Volován, Zoé

May 2008
Saturday, 14 May - Sunday, 15 May

Black Rebel Motorcycle Club, Reel Big Fish, Jarabe de Palo, Los Lobos, Babasónicos, Bersuit Vergarabat, The Wailers, Plastilina Mosh, Panteón Rococó, Los Tres, Los Cafres, El Gran Silencio, Panda (band), Todos Tus Muertos, Los Piojos, Nortec Collective, Los Auténticos Decadentes, La Habitación Roja, Los Straitjackets, El Otro Yo, Maldita Vecindad, Sussie 4, Liquits, Los Dynamite, Kapanga, Lost Acapulco, Javiera Mena, Botellita de Jerez, Santa Sabina, Quiero Club, Thermo, Insite, Niña, Los Fancy Free, Árbol, Dildo, Caramelos de Cianuro, Descartes a Kant, Tolidos, Disidente, Urlaub in Polen, Ceci Bastida, Los Daniels, Ángeles del Infierno, Le Baron, Ventilader, dante, Tren Loco, Satin Dolls, El Haragan, Los Mentas, Los Ratones Paranoicos, Los Caligaris, Sonidero Nacional, yokozuna, Kill Aniston, Gerardo Enciso, pato machete, Pánico Ramírez, DLD, Troker, Lawson, The Volture, Payro, Electric Co., Jackie'O, $6M Weirdo, Ágora and Sr. Flavio

June 2009
Saturday, 27 June - Sunday, 28 June

Los Fabulosos Cadillacs, Andrés Calamaro, Molotov, Kinky, Jaguares, Zoé, Los Bunkers, La Vela Puerca, Gondwana, La Gusana Ciega, Little Joy, La Fuga, Ximena Sariñana, Nortec Collective, La Lupita, Petra, Instituto Mexicano del Sonido, Austin TV, Fidel Nadal, Blasted Mechanism, Gepe, San Pascualito Rey, Hello Seahorse!, Vetusta Morla, Inspector, La Castañeda, Victimas Del Doctor Cerebro, Dios, Anita Tijoux, Monocordio, Casino, División Minúscula, Bengala, Hummersqueal, Silverio, Los Concorde, finde, La Pulqueria, Mariachi Terror, Rescate, Los Gatos, Jaramar, Guillotina, Volován, Los Daniels, Banda De Turistas, Cabezas de Cera, Adanowsky, Sekta Core, Bill, Marky Ramone, Los Esquizitos, Satin Dolls, Hana, Salón Victoria, Enjambre, Yokozuna, Fratta, Los Dorados, Paté de Fuá, Fenómeno Fuzz, Simplifires, Cienfue, Sr Mandril, Niña Dioz, Alonso Arreola, Ritmo Peligroso, Neon Walrus, Lemons, El Clan, Banda bostik, Alejandro Otaola, Maligno, Los Marty, Los Weeds, Play&Movil Project, discoRUIDO!, Atto & The Majestics, Oh My Oh, Consumatum Est, Dirty Karma, Clondementto, Santiago Behm, Pila Seca, Zordem, Mongol Gol Gol, The Satura, Desarmado and zanate y asociados.

April 2010
Friday, 23 April - Sunday, 25 April

Abominables, Ágora, Aguamala, Andrés Cantisani, Astro, Aterciopelados, Austin TV, Banda de Turistas, Bocafloja, Calexico, Calle 13, Carca, Cecilia Toussaint, Celso Piña, Cienfue, Corcobado, Cráneo de Jade, Crista Galli, Cuca, Chetes, DaPuntoBeat, Deftones, Descartes a Kant, DLD, Dr Frankenstein (ópera rock), Dr Krapula, El Cuarteto de Nos, Ely Guerra, Empire of the Sun, Estados Alterados, Francisca Valenzuela, Furland, Hello Seahorse! (surprise guest band), Juan Pablo Villa Julieta Venegas, Kafka Jones, Kapanga, Kenny (from Kenny and the Electrics), Kimah, Klemerzon, Kumbia Queers, La Chilanga Habanera, Le Butcherettes, LeBaron, Liber Teran, Liran'roll, Los Amigos Invisibles, Los Auténticos Decadentes, Los Mentas, Los Músicos de José, Los Negretes, Los Odio, Los Románticos de Zacatecas, Los Tres, Lost Acapulco, Malacates Trébol Shop, Mägo de Oz, Manuel García, Misterio, Monte Negro, Muna Zul, Mystica Girls, Nacho Vegas, Nos Llamamos, Ozomatli, Panteón Rococó, Paté de Fua, Pedro Piedra, Polka Madre, Pato Machete, Qué Payasos, Quiero Club, Rise Against, Rodrigo y Gabriela, Rostros Ocultos, Salón Victoria, San Pascualito Rey (surprise guest band), Silverio, Ska-P, Sonex, Sussie 4, Thermo, Tijuana No!, Todos Tus Muertos, Troker, Ventilader, Veo Muertos, Vicente Gayo, Víctimas del Doctor Cerebro, Victoria Mil.

April 2011
Friday, 8 April - Sunday, 10 April

  - 2 Minutos
   - Adanowsky
  - Agrupacion Cariño
  - Albert Pla
   - Alika & Nueva Alianza
  - Alonso Arreola
  - Alyosha Barreiro
  - Andrea Balency Trio
  - Ana Tijoux
  - Ansia
  - Atto and The Majestics
  - Azul Violeta
  - Babasónicos
  - Bam-Bam
  - Banda de Turistas
  - Bengala
  - Bogo
  - Bomba Estereo
  - Caifanes
  - Candy
  - Carla Borghetti
  - Carla Morrison
  - Carlos Ann
  - Cero Absoluto
  - Charly García
  - Chikita Violenta
  - Disco Ruido
  - Djamra
  - Dorian
  - Doctor Krápula
  - Draco Rosa
  - El Guincho
  - Electric Co.
  - Elis Paprika
   - Eljuri
  - Enanitos Verdes
  - Enjambre
  - Famas Loop
  - Fidel Nadal
  - Finde
  - Fobia
   - Frontline Guerrilla Sonora
  - Gula
  - Hana
  - Here Comes the Kraken
  - Hong Kong Blood Opera
  - Hummersqueal
  - Jane's Addiction
  - Jarabe de Palo
  - Jessy Bulbo
  - Joe Volume
  - Kipchoge and the Ginger Ninjas
  - La Barranca
  - La Dosis
  - La Gusana Ciega
  - La Hora de la Hora
  - La Internacional Sonora Balkanera
  - La Pulquería
  - Las Pastillas del Abuelo
  - Les Estuches
  - Letz Zep
  - Liber Teran
  - Liquits
  - Los Bunkers
  - Los Coronas
  - Los Daniels
  - Los de Abajo
  - Los Dorados
  - Los Elásticos
  - Los Estrambóticos
  - Los Licuadoras
  - Los Pericos
  - Macaco
  - Madame Recaimer
  - Mala Rodríguez
  - Manchuria
  - Mara (with Charlie Monttana)
  - Marlento
  - Nana Pancha
  - Natalia Lafourcade
  - No Te Va Gustar
  - Nortec Collective Presents: Bostich + Fussible
  - Payro
  - People's Project
  - Pito Pérez
  - Proyecto Geko
  - Puerquerama
  - Radaid
   - Rana Santacruz
  - Raxas
  - Rebel Cats
  - Rey Pila
  - Ruido Rosa
  - Rulo y La Contrabanda
  - San Pascualito Rey
  - Sara Valenzuela
  - Sepultura
  - Seven Rays
  - She's a Tease
  - Sho Trio
  - Sonidero Mestizo
  - Tanke
  - Telefunka
  - Telesis
  - The Chemical Brothers
  - The National
  - The Pinker Tones
  - The Plastics Revolution
  - Tokyo Ska Paradise Orchestra
  - Torreblanca
  - Turbina
  - Velandía y la Tigra
  - Vicente Gayo
  - Yokozuna

Additionals group musics and artists
  - Stratens
  - Ultrasónico
  - Vate

March 2012
Friday, 23 March - Sunday, 25 March

  - Adhesivo
  - Alfonso Andre
  - Amandititita
  - Antidoping
  - Antoine Reverb
  - Astro
  - Atto & The Majestics
  - Austin TV
  - Black Tide
  - Boxer
  - Brainkiller
  - Café Tacuba
  - Caramelos de Cianuro
  - Capo
  - Caravana
  - Carla Morrison
  - Catupecu Machu
  - Comisario Pantera
  - Def Con Dos
  - Dënver
  - Descartes a Kant
  - Disidente
  - DLD
  - Dr. Fanatik
  - Eddy y Los Grasosos
  - El Brujo
  - El Columpio Asesino
  - El Haragán y Compañia
  - El Personal
  - Enrique Bunbury
  - Esperantho
  - Estirpe
  - Fatboy Slim
  - Forastero y Manicomio Clan
  - Foster the People
  - Francisca Valenzuela
  - Furland
  - GG Bross
  - Gogol Bordello
  - Hello Seahorse!
  - Hocico
   - HopPo!
  - Hueco
  - Illya Kuryaki and the Valderramas
  - Instituto Mexicano del Sonido
  - Jaime López
  - Jauría
  - Javiera Mena
  - Jazztec
  - Jinetes Eléctricos
  - Juan Cirerol
  - Jumbo
  - Kapanga
  - Kasabian
  - Kinky
  - La Lupita
  - La Vida Bohème
  - Los Caligaris
  - Los Drama Queers
  - Los Esquizitos
  - Los Infierno
  - Los Kung-Fu Monkeys
  - Los Meffisto
  - Los Patita de Perro
  - Lost Acapulco
  - Madness
  - Mal'akh
  - Mamá Pulpa
  - Mamastróficos
  - Manel
  - Manos de Topo
  - Maskatesta
  - Mexican Dubwiser
  - Molotov
  - Monareta
  - Monocordio
   - Napoleón Solo
  - Niña
  - Nonpalidece
   - Paté de Fuá
  - Pedro Piedra
  - Perrosky
  - Phito Torres
  - Puerquerama
  - Qbo
  - Rebel Cats
  - Ricardo Asociados "Zanate"
  - Ritmo Machine
  - Ritmo Peligroso
  - Robota
  - Rod Levario
  - Screaming Headless Torsos
  - Sekta Core!
  - Selecto-On
  - SFDK
   - Shokora
  - Skampida
  - Siddhartha
  - Sr. Flavio
  - Sol Pereyra
  - Sonido San Francisco
  - Suave as Hell
  - Systema Solar
   - Tamales de Chipil
  - Tanke
  - The Horrors
  - The Sconek-t
  - The Volture
  - The Wookies
  - Toy Selectah
  - Triciclo Circus Band
  - Tropikal Forever
  - Tungas
  - TV on the Radio
  - URSS Bajo el Árbol
  - V for Volume
  - Venado Azul
  - Vesspa
  - Vetusta Morla
  - Vicente Gayo
  - Voltax
  - Wrokk
  - Zaide
  - Zoé

March 2013
Thursday, 14 March - Sunday, 17 March

  - !Deladap
  - A Band of Bitches
  - Afrodita
  - Aiken
  - Alex Andwanter
  - Apolo
   - Arianna Puello
  - Armando Palomas
  - Arreola + Carballo
  - Austin TV
  - Balkanbeats
  - Banda de Turistas
  - Bengala
  - Blur
  - Bomba Estéreo
  - Bosnian Rainbows
  - Cabo San Roque
  - Camila Moreno
  - Candy
  - Carla Morrison
  - Celso Piña
  - Centavrvs
   - Chicha Libre
  - Chico Trujillo
  - Comisario Pantera
  - Corizonas
  - Cultura Profética
  - Dapuntobeat
  - Dardo
  - De Nalgas
  - División Minúscula
  - DLD
  - Dorian
  - Dread Mar-I
  - El Cuarteto de Nos
  - Él Mató a un Policia Motorizado
  - El Tri
  - Enjambre
  - Esteman
  - Faltosos
  - Fenómeno Fuzz
  - Flip Tamez
  - Fobia
  - Francois Peglau
  - Franny Glass
  - Garrobos
  - Gepe
  - Golden Ganga
  - Here Comes the Kraken
  - Inclanfunk
  - Japandroids
    - Jenny and the Mexicats
  - Jovanotti
  - Juan Cirerol
  - Kchiporros
  - La Banderville
  - La Furia con Lujuria Sonidera
  - Las Victimas del Doctor Cerebro
  - Lazcano Malo
  - Le Baron
  - Leider
  - Liber Terán
  - Los Aguas Aguas
  - Los Amigos Invisibles
  - Los Ángeles Azules
  - Los Auténticos Decadentes
  - Los Cuchillos
  - Los Daniels
  - Los Fabulosos Cadillacs
  - Los Jaigüey
  - Los Macuanos
  - Los Punsetes
  - Los Románticos de Zacatecas
  - Los Viejos
  - Love of Lesbian
  - Mala Rodríguez
  - Max Capote
  - Mompox
  - Monsieur Periné
  - Mostro
  - Motor
  - Nabuzenco
  - Naftalina
  - Natalia Lafourcade
  - Negros Vivos
  - Nortec Collective Presents: Bostich + Fussible
  - Ocean's Aoustic
  - Odisseo
  - Ondatrópica
  - Orka
  - Orquesta Garash
  - Panteón Rococó
  - Pato Machete
  - Pegasvs
  - Pez Diablo
  - Porter
  - Puerto Candelaria
  - Quinto Sol
   - Radio Kaos
  - Rarefolk
  - Real de Catorce
  - Red Oblivion
  - Renoh
  - Salón Victoria
  - Seward
  - Señor Loop
  - Silversun Pickups
  - Ska-P
  - Sonido Changoramico
  - Sonido San Francisco
  - Sonido Desconocido
  - Sonido Gallo Negro
  - Sonido Landon
  - Soziedad Alkoholika
  - Split Heaven
  - Sussie 4
  - Tame Impala 
  - Tex Tex
  - The Drágulas
  - Tio Gus
  - Twin Tones
  - Ulises Hadjis
  - Underworld
  - Via Rústica
  - Violadores del Verso
  - Volcán
  - Xoel López
  - Yeah Yeah Yeahs
  - Yokozuna

Changes, cancelations and surprise acts 

  - Morrissey (Canceled)
  - Enjambre 14/03/2013 -> 15/03/2013
  - Pegasvs 14/03/2013 -> 15/03/2013
  - Centavrvs 14/03/2013 -> 15/03/2013

March 2014 

  - 2 Many DJ's
  - AFI
  - Alerta Kamarada
  - Alex Otaola & Iraida Noriega
  - Amandititita
   - Ana Tijoux
  - Arcade Fire
  - Atto & the Majestics
  - Aurora
  - Autoramas
  - Banda Bastón
  - Banda Bostik
  - Búngalo Dub ft. Lengualerta
  - Caballeros del Plan G
  - Cállate Mark
  - Calle 13
  - Caloncho
  - Camila Moreno
  - Carlos Marks
  - Carlos Méndez
  - Carmen Costa
  - Carnavale Di Vendetta
  - Ceci Bastida
  - Chancha Vía Circuito
  - Charlie Montana
    - Che Sudaka
  - Choclock
  - ChocQuibTown
  - Clubz
  - Coctél Intergaláctico
  - Coda
  - Cómo Asesinar a Felipes
  - Consulado Popular
  - Cooper Gamins
  - Cut Copy
  - Dancing Mood
  - Daniela Spalla
  - Daniel Maloso
  - Dani Umpi
    - De la Tierra
  - Diamante Eléctrico
  - Diplo
  - DJ Rupture
  - Doctor Krápula
  - El Chávez
  - El Freaky
  - El Gran Silencio
  - Elis Paprika
  - Ely Guerra
   - Emir Kusturica & The No Smoking Orchestra
  - Enanitos Verdes
  - Estelares
  - Férmin IV
  - Fito Páez
  - Frikstallers
  - Furland
  - Gaia
  - Guadalupe Plata
  - Helado Negro
  - Hello Seahorse!
  - I Can Chase Dragons!
  - Javier Estrada
  - Jessica Hernández & The Deltas
  - Juan Soto
  - Juana Fe
  - Juana Molina
  - Julieta Venegas
  - Jumbo
  - Kakkmaddafakka
  - Komodo
  - Kraken
  - L.A.
  - La Bien Querida
  - La Castañeda
  - La Gusana Ciega
  - Lao
  - La Ley
   - La Santa Cecilia
  - La Vela Puerca
  - La Vida Bohème
  - Leo Justi
  - Liquits
  - Little Jesus
  - Lori Meyers
  - Los Bunkers
  - Los Cafres
  - Los Caligaris
  - Los Esquizitos
  - Los Fascinantes
  - Los Fontana
  - Los Infierno
  - Los Inmortales SA
  - Los Marty
  - Los Planetas
  - Los Rastrillos
  - Los Rumberos de Boston
  - Los Tigres del Norte
  - Los Tiros
  - Los Tres
  - Love of Lesbian
  - Lunice
  - Luzbel
  - Machingon
  - Mad Professor
  - Maldita Vecindad y los Hijos del Quinto Patio
  - Mooi
  - Motorama
  - Nine Inch Nails
  - No Te Va Gustar
  - Odisseo
  - Of Montreal
  - Onda Vaga
  - Outernational
  - Pablito Mix
  - Pato Watson
  - Pedro Piedra
  - Pellejos
  - Placebo
  - Proyecto Maconha
  - Quantic
  - Radaid
  - Rebel Cats
  - Reyno
  - Rey Pila
  - Royal Club
  - Rusko
  - RVSB
  - Sangre Maíz
  - Saoko
  - Schlachthofbronx
  - Segregados
  - Seis Peatones
  - Siete Catorce
  - Silverio
  - Simpson a Huevo
  - Sonido La Changa
  - Sonido Martines
  - Sonido San Francisco
  - Sonido Sonorámico
  - Sonido Super Chango
  - Señor Bikini
  - Standstill
  - Tako
  - Technicolor Fabrics
  - The Burning of Rome
  - The Cavernarios
  - The Polyphonic Spree
  - The Sexican
  - The Wookies
  - Todd Clouser & A Love Electric
  - Torreblanca
  - Troker
  - Twenty One Pilots
  - Un Día de Octubre
  - URSS Bajo el Árbol
  - Vicente Gayo
  - Vintage Trouble
  - Yokozuna
  - Zoé
  - Zurdok
  - Zutzut!

Changes, cancellations and surprise acts 
  - Cadena Perpetua (Canceled)
  - DJ Rashad & DJ Spinn (Canceled)
  - Primal Scream (Canceled)
  - La Esfinge (Surprise Act)

March 2015 

  - 2 Minutos
  - 3er. Acto
  - 424
  - A Band of Bitches
  - Agarrate Catalina
  - AJ Dávila
  - Andre VII
  - Apanhador Só
  - Apocalyptica
  - Ases Falsos
  - Aterciopelados
  - Babasónicos
  - Barrio Chachín
  - Bomba Estéreo
  - Brandon Flowers
  - Bufi
  - Caifanes
  - Camilo Séptimo
  - Cartel de Santa
  - Catupecu Machu
  - Centavrvs
  - Cocotaxi
  - Compass: Instituto Mexicano del Sonido & Toy Selectah
  - Corazón Attack
  - Cuca
  - Dave Crowe
  - Dave Matthews Band
  - Decibel
  - Dengue Dengue Dengue
  - Dënver
  - Detonantes
  - Die Antwoord
  - Disko Balkan
  - DLD
  - El Columpio Asesino
  - El Gran Karim & Aztek 732
  - El Hijo de la Cumbia
  - Él Mató a un Policía Motorizado
  - Enjambre
  - Erszebeth
  - Galatzia
  - Garbage
  - Genitallica
  - Gil Cerezo
  - Happy Mondays
  - Hawaiian Gremlins
  - Interpol
  - Interpuesto
  - Iraida Noriega y La Groovy Band
  - Jandro
  - Jefes del Desierto
  - Joliette
  - Jorge Drexler
  - Juan Cirerol
  - Julie Doppler
  - K.e.e.n.e.
  - La Lupita
  - La Milixia
  - La Minitik del Miedo
  - La Revolución de Emiliano Zapata
  - La Sucursal de la Cumbia
  - La Tostadora
  - Leiden
  - Los Ángeles Negros
  - Los Elásticos
  - Los Fresones Rebeldes
  - Los Románticos de Zacatecas
  - Los Rusos Hijos de Puta
  - Los Victorios
  - Louie Fresco
  - Lucybell
  - Lumumba
  - María del Pilar
  - Mariel Mariel
  - Mastodon
  - Matías Aguayo
  - Mc Peligro
  - Meketrefe
  - Metrika
  - Mississippi Queens
  - Molotov
  - Molotov Jukebox
  - Mon Laferte
  - Monsieur Periné
  - Mr. Pauer
  - Nacho Vegas
  - Nortec Collective Presents: Bostich + Fussible
  - O Tortuga
  - Omar Torrez
  - Operación Jarocha & Los Vega
  - Polyterror
  - Poncho
  - Presidente
  - Robert Plant & The Sensational Space Shifters
  - Roll Circus
  - S7N
  - San Cisco
  - San Pascualito Rey
  - Sánchez Dub & Bn Loco
  - Seconds
  - Siddhartha
  - Slktr
  - Soldiers of Jah Army
  - Sonido Gallo Negro
  - Sonido La Conga
  - Sonido Pancho
  - Sotomayor
  - Subatomic Sound System
  - Superlitio
  - Supersónicos
  - Telefunka
  - The John Band
  - The Last Internationale
  - The Melovskys
  - The Specials
  - The Vaccines
  - Tinariwen
  - Tino el Pingüino
  - Triciclo Circus Band
  - Tropikal Forever
  - Utopians
  - Violentango
  - We Are the Grand
  - Ximena Sariñana
  - Zaide
   - Zonora Point & King Dou Dou

Changes, cancellations and surprise acts 

  - Loquillo (Canceled)
  - Leo Pérez (Canceled)
  - NOFX (Canceled)
  - Ágora (Surprise Act)
  - Austin TV (Surprise Act)
  - Rebel Cats (Surprise Act)
  - Natalia Lafourcade & Meme (of Café Tacuba) (Surprise Act)
  - Quiero Club (Surprise Act)
  - Liquits & Jessy Bulbo (Surprise Act)

April 2016 

  - Agrupación Cariño
  - Ampersan
  - Apolo
  - Baroness
  - Big Big Love
  - Black Overdrive
  - Café Tacuba
  - Camila Moreno
  - Carla Morrison
  - Charlie Rodd
  - Chetes
  - Clemente Castillo
  - Comisario Pantera
  - Cultura Profética
  - De Nalgas
  - Disco Ruido
  - DLD
  - Dorian
  - Easy Easy
  - Eddie y Los Grasosos
  - El Juguete Rabioso
  - Enrique Bunbury
  - Gepe
  - Goran Bregović
  - Gustavo Cordera
  - Heavy Nopal
   - Ibeyi
  - Indios
  - Ingrid Beaujean
  - Julio Revueltas
  - Kanaku y El Tigre
  - Kike
  - Kill Aniston
     - La Chiva Gantiva
  - La Real Academia del Sonido
  - Las Manos de Filippi
  - León Larregui
  - Liquits
  - Los Abominables
  - Los Auténticos Decadentes
  - Los Frankys
  - Los Norteños Light
  - Los Toreros Muertos
  - Los Viejos
  - Los Yerberos
  - Lost Acapulco
  - Lospetitfellas
  - Love la Femme
  - Maligno
  - Mcklopedia
  - Nach
  - Natalia Lafourcade
  - No Te Va Gustar
  - Nunca Jamás
  - Of Monsters and Men
  - Ojo de Buey
  - Pedrina y Rio
  - Piluso
  - Plastilina Mosh
  - Porter
  - Pressive
  - Pumcayó
  - Qbo
  - Rain Shatter
  - Reyno
  - Rock en tu Idioma Sinfónico
  - Savages
  - Sekta Core!
  - Silva de Alegría
  - Sputnik
  - Surfistas del Sistema
  - Systema Solar
  - Tex Tex
   - The Chamanas
  - The Guadaloops
  - The Prodigy
  - Todos Tus Muertos
  - Tototomás
  - Tungas
  - Two Door Cinema Club
  - Vetamadre
  - Vicentico

March 2017 

  - Agora
  - Akasha
  - Antidoping
  - Árbol de Ojos
  - Attaque 77
  - Babasónicos
  - Beta
  - Bronco
   - Brujeria
    - Burning Caravan
  - Candy
  - Carlos Sadness
  - Celtas Cortos
  - Chingadazo de Kung-Fu
  - Costera
  - Crew Peligrosos
  - Diamante Electrico
  - Doctor Krápula
  - Dolores de Huevos
  - Dread Mar-I
  - El Cuarteto de Nos
    - El General Paz & La Triple Frontera
  - El Zombie
  - Enanitos Verdes
  - Esteman
  - Faauna
  - Fanko
  - Foxygen
  - G-Eazy
  - Hombres G
  - Illya Kuryaki and the Valderramas
  - Inspector
  - Izal
  - Jake Bugg
  - Jarabe de Palo
   - Javier Corcobado
  - Jazmín Solar
  - Juana la Rodillona
  - JotDog
   - Julieta Venegas
  - Justice
  - Kinky
  - La Barranca
  - La Pegatina
  - La Sonora Santanera
  - La Tremenda Korte
  - Lira N' Roll
  - Little Jesus
  - Lng/SHT
  - Los Caligaris
  - Los Desenchufados
  - Los Fabulosos Cadillacs
  - Los Rayobacks
  - Los Veltons
  - Marky Ramone
  - Meme
  - Mexican Dubwiser
  - Mexican Juligans
  - Mon Laferte
  - Monocordio
  - Moonspell
  - Morenito de Fuego
  - Neón
  - Novedades Carminha
  - Okills
  - Orkesta Mendoza
  - Orquesta 24 Cuadros
  - Out of Control Army
  - Prophets of Rage
  - Rancid
  - Seis Pistos
  - Shoot the Radio
  - Tessa Ia
  - The 5.6.7.8's
  - The Cavernarios
  - The Pretty Reckless
  - Thermo
  - We Are the Grand
  - Xixa
  - Zoé

Changes, cancellations and surprise acts 

  - Wakrat (Canceled)

March 2018 

  - 424
  - A.N.I.M.A.L.
  - Airbag
  - Allison 
  - Amandititita 
  - Banda Bastón
  - Banda Regional Mixe
  - Belako
  - Camilo Septimo
  - Cartel de Santa
  - Centavrvs
  - Chicano Batman
  - Cuca
  - Donkristobal
  - El David Aguilar
  - Él Mató a un Policía Motorizado
  - Elsa y Elmar
  - Enjambre
  - Entrelineas
  - Francisca y Los Exploradores vs Juan Ingaramo
  - Fito Páez
  - Francisco, El Hombre
  - Gorillaz
  - Gondwana
  - El Haragán y Compañía
  - Heavysaurios
  - Infected Mushroom
  - Instituto Mexicano del Sonido
  - José Octavio I
   - Kali Uchis
  - Kchiporros
  - Kase.O 
  - Klub (Los Autenticos Reggaementes)
  - Kuervos del Sur
  - La Beriso
  - La Gusana Ciega
  - La Lupita
  - La Toma
  - La Vela Puerca
  - La Vodkanera
  - Las Pastillas del Abuelo
  - Leslie Grun
  - Little Dragon
  - Los Amantes de Lola
  - Los Amigos Invisibles
  - Los Blenders
  - Los Cafres
  - Los de Abajo
  - Los Jaivas
  - Los Mesoneros
  - Los Moustros del Espacio Exterior
  - Los Pericos
  - Love of Lesbian
  - Mala Rodríguez
  - Maria Daniela y su Sonido Lasser
  - Millonario
  - Molotov
  - Morrissey
  - Nicola Cruz
  - Noel Gallagher's High Flying Birds
  - No Tiene la Vaca
  - Panteón Rococó
    - Paté de Fuá
  - Pussy Riot
  - PVRIS
  - Queens of the Stone Age
  - Residente
  - Riesgo de Contagio
  - Ritmo Peligroso
  - Sabino
  - San Pascualito Rey
  - Santa Estilo
  - Sierra León
  - Sergio Arau & Los Heavy Mex
  - Sexy Zebras
      - Swing Original Monks
  - Rock en tu Idioma Sinfonico - Vol. II
  - Titán
  - Übon
  - Vaya Futuro
  - Vetusta Morla
  - Víctimas del Doctor Cerebro
  - Viernes Verde

Changes, cancellations and surprise acts 

  - Los Tres (Cancelled)

March 2019 

  - Aleman
  - Alfonso Andre y Amigos presents: Tribute to David Bowie
  - Bomba Estereo
  - Bengala 
  - Cafe Tacvba 
  - Caifanes
  - Correos
  - Daniela Spalla
  - Dillon Francis
  - Division Minuscula
   - Draco Rosa
  - Editors
  - El Gran Silencio
  - El Tri
  - Enrique Bunbury
  - Fantastic Negrito
  - Fermín IV
  - Flor de Toloache
  - Foals
  - Fobia
  - Galindo
  - Gandhi
  - Guasones
  - Hælos
  - Hello Seahorse!
  - Ilegales
  - Intocable
  - Juanes
  - Juanse
  - Javier Batiz
  - Jumbo
  - Kill Aniston 
  - Korn 
  - La Castañeda
  - La Pingos Orquesta
  - La Sexta Vocal
  - Liquits
  - Los Tres
  - Lanza Internacional
  - Los Afro Brothers
  - Los Estramboticos
  - Los Viejos
  - LP
  - Machingon
  - Mad Tree
  - Mateo Kingman
  - Miguel Mateos
  - Miranda!
  - Nach
  - Noah Pino Palo
  - Odisseo
  - Oi-Skall Mates
  - Orquesta Damaso Perez Prado
  - Orquesta Mondragon
  - Óscar Chávez
  - Rastrillos
  - Rawayana
  - Rude Boys
   - Santana
  - Santa Sabina
  - Siddhartha 
  - Ska-P 
   - Skip & Die
  - Snow Patrol
  - Sonido Gallo Negro
  - Stoner Love
  - Technotronic
  - The 1975
  - The Bomboras
  - The Inspector Cluzo
  - The Plastics Revolution
  - Turf
  - Too Many Zooz
  - Tino el Pinguino
  - Vaquero Negro
  - Viva Suecia
  - Ximena Sariñana
  - Zona Ganjah

March 2020 

  - 31 Minutos
  - All Them Witches
  - Ambar Lucid
  - Andres Calamaro 
  - Armando Palomas 
  - Babasonicos
  - Batallas de Campeones
  - Bersuit Vergarabat
  - Bizanga
  - Black Pumas
  - Bratty
  - Carlos Sadness
  - Carlos Vives
  - Charles Ans
  - Chetes
  - Chico Trujillo
  - Cuarteto de Nos
  - Cultura Profetica
  - Damas Gratis
  - Desorden Publico
  - Disidente
  - DLD
  - Duki
  - Ed Maverick
  - El Poder del Barrio
  - Elefantes
  - Ely Guerra
  - Fangoria
  - Feria de Frescos
  - Flor Amargo
  - Francisca Valenzuela
  - Gera MX 
  - Girl Ultra 
  - Golden Ganga
  - Guns N' Roses
  - Gustavo Santaolalla
  - Hamac Caziim
  - Indios
    - Jupiter & Okwess
  - Kyary Pamyu Pamyu
  - La Bruja de Texcoco
  - La Doble A
  - La Garfield
  - Leiva
  - Little Jesus
  - Los Daniels
  - Los Tucanes de Tijuana
  - Madame Recamier
  - MexFutura
  - Milky Chance
  - Mogwai
  - Negro y Las Nieves de Enero
  - Nortec Collective: Bostich + Fussible
  - Odio a Botero
  - Pillanes
  - Porter
  - Portugal. The Man
  - Rebel Cats
  - Rey Pila
  - Reyno 
  - Rodrigo y Gabriela 
  - Rubytates
  - Salon Victoria
  - Salvador y el Unicornio
  - Say Ocean
  - She Wants Revenge
  - SHO-TAI
  - Silvana Estrada
  - Skott
  - Soulwax
  - The Cardigans
  - The Phantom Four
  - The Rasmus
  - The Warming
  - The Wookies
  - Usted Señalemelo
  - Valsian
  - Vetusta Morla
  - Vicentico
  - Victoria Malawi
  - Yucatan a Go-Go
  - Zero Kill
  - Zoe

March 2022 

  - Aczino
  - All Them Witches
  - Ambar Lucid
  - Banda MS
     - Batallas de Campeones
  - Biznaga
  - Blssom
  - Black Pumas
  - Bruses
  - Camilo Séptimo
  - Cecilia Toussaint
  - Centavrvs
  - Conociendo Rusia
  - C. Tangana
  - Cnvs
  - Daniel Quien
   - Devendra Banhart
  - Dread Mar-I
  - Elis Paprika
  - Erich
  - Eruca Sativa
  - Fangoria
  - Fernando Delgadillo
  - Gary Clark Jr.
  - Gepe
  - Gran Sur
  - Grandson
  - Gustavo Santaolalla
  - Javier Blake
  - Julieta Venegas
  - Kevin Kaarl
  - La Banda del Bisonte
  - La Delio Valdez
  - La Gusana Ciega
  - La Isla Centeno
  - La Lupita
  - La Tribu
  - Los Auténticos Decadentes
  - Limp Bizkit
  - Los Blenders
   - Lido Pimienta
  - Los Cogelones
  - Los Fabulosos Cadillacs
   - Los No Tan Tristes (Gera MX, Nanpa Básico & Charles Ans)
   - Los Señores
  - Luis Pescetti
  - Love of Lesbian
  - Making Movies
  - Maldita Vecindad y los Hijos del Quinto Patio
  - Massacre
  - Milky Chance
  - Moenia
  - Mogwai
  - Nancys Rubias
  - Oh'laville
  - Okills
  - Patrick Miller
  - Pelo Madueño
  - Ramona
  - Pixies
  - Residente
  - Serbia
  - Santa Fe Klan
  - Son Rompe Pera
  - Siddhartha
  - Taburete
  - Technicolor Fabrics
  - The Marias
  - Trueno
  - Vanessa Zamora
  - Vetusta Morla
  - Wos

March 2023 

  - 2 Minutos
  - Alemán
  - Álex Ferreira
  - Allison
  - Alt-J
  - Amandititita
  - Ästra
  - Austin TV
  - Astronomía Interior
  - Batalla de Campeones Delux
  - Bandalos Chinos
  - Buscabulla
  - Café Tacvba
  - Cala Vento
  - Carín León
  - Carla Morrison
  - Circa Waves
  - Coque Malla
  - Daniela Spalla
  - De Saloon
  - Dharius
  - Duki
  - Elsa y Elmar
  - Enjambre
  - Estelares
  - Esteman
  - Gayle
  - Grupo Pesado
  - Guitarricadelafuente
  - Herencia de Patrones
  - Insurpipol
  - Kase.O (Jazz Magnetism)
  - Kinky
  - La Dame Blanche
  - La Maravillosa Orquesta del Alcohol
   - La Santa Cecilia
  - Las Áñez
  - Las Ligas Menores
  - Lauri García
  - Leiva
  - León Larregui
  - Leonardo de Lozanne
  - Lila Downs
  - Los Bunkers
  - Los Caligaris
  - Los Claxons
  - Los Dynamite
  - Los Estrambóticos
  - Los Mirlos
  - Los Pericos
  - Los Santos Inocentes
  - Lost Acapulco
  - MC Davo
  - Miranda!
  - Miss Caffeina
  - Monsieur Periné
   - Neto Peña & Yoss Bones
  - Odisseo
  - Paul Oakenfold
  - Plastilina Mosh
  - Qbo
  - Queralt Lahoz
  - Rayos Láser
  - Real de Catorce
  - Red Hot Chili Peppers
  - Resorte
  - Reyno
  - Sen Senra
  - Sergio Arau
  - Siamés
  - Sidonie
  - Silvestre y la Naranja
  - Solo Valencia
  - Steve 'N' Seagulls
  - The Black Crowes
  - Tokyo Ska Paradise Orchestra
  - UB40
  - Vivir Quintana
  - Yorka

See also 
 List of music festivals in Mexico

References

External links 
Official website

Festivals in Mexico City
Music festivals established in 1998
Rock festivals in Mexico
Music in Mexico City
Tourist attractions in Mexico City
Latin American festivals
Spring (season) events in Mexico